Nick Thompson is a former American soccer player in the USL and current American soccer coach.

Career

College
Thompson attended Messiah College in Grantham, Pennsylvania. From 2007 to 2010, Thompson made 99 appearances for the Falcons, scoring 54 goals and assisting 18 times, while winning three NCAA Division III national titles. During his senior season at Messiah Thompson earned First Team All-Commonwealth Conference, First Team All-Mid-Atlantic, Second Team All-American, First Team D3Soccer.com All-American, and Commonwealth Conference Player of the year honors.

Professional
Thompson was signed by the Carolina RailHawks of the North American Soccer League for the 2011 season. He made his professional debut for Carolina on June 25, 2011 as a late game substitute against Atlanta Silverbacks. After a brief coaching stint at Eastern Nazarene College, he was able to secure a transfer to the Pittsburgh Riverhounds, to play for former Messiah College Men's Soccer coach Dave Brandt and alongside his younger brother Jack Thompson, who is also a member of the club. On November 30, 2017, Thompson's contract with the club expired and was not renewed. He departed Pittsburgh after two seasons with the Riverhounds.

Coaching career

While in Massachusetts, Thompson also served as assistant coach of Gordon College Men's Soccer (Wenham, MA). He briefly took over as Head Coach of Eastern Nazarene College Men's Soccer in Quincy, MA, before signing to play for the Riverhounds. He is now an assistant coach for the University of New Hampshire Men's Soccer Team.

References

External links
 Messiah Bio
 Railhawks bio

1988 births
Living people
American soccer players
Cleveland Internationals players
North Carolina FC players
Pittsburgh Riverhounds SC players
USL Championship players
USL League Two players
North American Soccer League players
Soccer players from Akron, Ohio
Association football midfielders
Messiah Falcons men's soccer players
American soccer coaches
NC State Wolfpack men's soccer coaches
Navy Midshipmen men's soccer coaches
Gordon Fighting Scots men's soccer coaches
California Baptist Lancers women's soccer coaches
Eastern Nazarene Lions men's soccer coaches
Williams Ephs men's soccer coaches
New Hampshire Wildcats men's soccer coaches